The 1961 Wyoming Cowboys football team was an American football team that represented the University of Wyoming as a member of the Skyline Conference during the 1961 NCAA University Division football season. In their fifth season under head coach Bob Devaney, the Cowboys compiled a 6–1–2 record (5–0–1 against Skyline opponents), tied for the Skyline Conference championship, and outscored opponents by a total of 171 to 74.

The team's statistical leaders included Andy Melosky with 464 passing yards, Chuck Lamson with 451 rushing yards, and Mike Walker with 468 receiving yards and 30 points scored.

Schedule

References

Wyoming
Wyoming Cowboys football seasons
Mountain States Conference football champion seasons
Wyoming Cowboys football